Sierra Leone competed at the 1980 Summer Olympics in Moscow, USSR.

Results by event

Athletics
Men's 100 metres
 Sheku Boima
 Heat — 11.08 (→ did not advance)

 John Carew
 Heat — 11.11 (→ did not advance)

 Rudolph George
 Heat — 11.37 (→ did not advance)

Men's 200 metres
 Sheku Boima
 Heat — 22.93 (→ did not advance)

 Walter During
 Heat — 23.12 (→ did not advance)

 Rudolph George
 Heat — 23.30 (→ did not advance)

Men's 800 metres
 George Branche 
 Heat — 1:54.6 (→ did not advance)

 Sahr Kendor 
 Heat — 2:06.5 (→ did not advance)

 Jimmy Massallay 
 Heat — 2:04.4 (→ did not advance)

Men's 1,500 metres
George Branche
 Heat — 4:03.9 (→ did not advance)

Men's Marathon
 Baba Ibrahim Suma-Keita
 Final — 2:41:20 (→ 46th place)

Men's 4x400 metres Relay
 William Akabi-Davis, Jimmy Massallay, Sahr Kendor, and George Branche
 Heat — 3:25.0 (→ did not advance)

Men's Decathlon
 Columba Blango
 Final — 5080 points (→ 16th place)

Women's 100 metres
 Eugenia Osho-Williams
 Heat — 12.95 (→ did not advance)

 Estella Meheux
 Heat — 13.22 (→ did not advance)

Women's 800 metres
 Eugenia Osho-Williams
 Heat — 2:33.4 (→ did not advance)

Women's 100 m Hurdles
Estella Meheux 
 Heat — 15.61 (→ did not advance)

Women's Long Jump
 Estella Meheux
 Qualifying Round — did not start (→ did not advance, no ranking)

Boxing
Men's Lightweight (60 kg)
 Mohamed Bangura
 First Round — Lost to Viktor Demyanenko (Soviet Union) after disqualification in second round

References
Official Olympic Reports

Nations at the 1980 Summer Olympics
1980
Oly